Acritocera is a genus of moths belonging to the family Cossidae.

Species
Acritocera negligens Butler, 1886

References

Cossidae genera